Kanhileri is a village in Kannur district in the Indian state of Kerala.

Demographics

Economy

Location

History

Nearby villages

Transportation

References

Villages near Taliparamba